This is a list of cannabis seed companies. Some of these supply only hempseed, that is, cultivars that produce low levels of THC (allowable levels are determined by local regulation).

BSF Seeds
Coopérative Centrale Des Producteurs De Semences De Chanvre, France, is the main supplier of hempseed in the European Union.
Dutch Passion
The Flying Dutchman
Homegrown Fantasy
Humboldt Seed Company
Schiavi Seeds
Sensi Seeds
Serious Seeds
Soma Seeds

United States regulation
Prior to enactment of the 2018 United States farm bill, hempseed imports to the United States had to be made through the Drug Enforcement Agency.

References

Seed companies